Serge Pun (Theim Wai; ; born 1953 in Rangoon, Burma) is a Burmese businessman of Burmese-Chinese descent. He is the chairman of Serge Pun & Associates Group (SPA Group), a multinational real estate firm, and Yoma Bank, a Burma-based bank. Born in Burma, he migrated to Beijing in 1965, 3 years following the coup d'état by Ne Win and subsequent reprisals on foreign residents. In 1973, he left China for Hong Kong, where he began a career in real estate. Pun returned to Burma in 1991 to establish SPA Myanmar, which is now one of Burma's largest conglomerates, spanning several sectors including automobile manufacturing, financial services, real estate development, technology, construction and healthcare. Pun's brother, Martin Pun, is the vice chairman of SPA Group.

Pun was ranked #38 in Singapore's Richest 50 in the August 2013 issue of Forbes Asia, with a net worth of USD $500 million.

See also
Yoma Bank

References

Burmese businesspeople
1953 births
Living people
Burmese people of Chinese descent
People from Yangon